Zicídeva was an Early Byzantine town, tentatively identified with the late antique settlement excavated on the top of Tsarevets hill, near modern Veliko Tarnovo in northern Bulgaria.

References

Bibliography

 

Geography of Veliko Tarnovo Province
Roman towns and cities in Bulgaria
Moesia Inferior